Yaniv Abargil (born 16 August 1977) is an Israeli footballer.

Honours

Team
Peace Cup
2000–01, won on 10 September 2000 with Beitar Jerusalem in Rome. Abargil scored 4 goals out of the 8 that Beitar Jerusalem scored, 3 goals in the 1st Game (won 7–0 over AlWaqass of Jordan) and 1 goal in the 2nd game (won 1–0 over AS Roma). Each game lasted 45 minutes.Beitar Jerusalem's Report:  (Hebrew) http://www.beitar-jerusalem.org.il/news/news0900.htm#i7

Toto Cup
Runners-up (1): 2000–01 Toto Cup Al (with Beitar Jerusalem)Liga Alef (North) (3):2007–08, 2008–09, 2010–11

IndividualIsraeli Premier League: Top Goalscorer (18 Goals)'''
2002–03

References

External links
 Profile at One

1977 births
20th-century Israeli Jews
21st-century Israeli Jews
Living people
Israeli footballers
Israel international footballers
Jewish Israeli sportspeople
Beitar Tel Aviv F.C. players
Hapoel Kfar Saba F.C. players
Beitar Jerusalem F.C. players
Maccabi Petah Tikva F.C. players
Hapoel Be'er Sheva F.C. players
Bnei Sakhnin F.C. players
Maccabi Ahi Nazareth F.C. players
Ironi Tiberias F.C. players
Hapoel Umm al-Fahm F.C. players
Ahva Arraba F.C. players
Ironi Umm al-Fahm F.C. players
Maccabi Kafr Kanna F.C. players
Maccabi Umm al-Fahm F.C. players
F.C. Bu'eine players
Hapoel Bu'eine F.C. players
Ahi Bir al-Maksur F.C. players
Liga Leumit players
Israeli Premier League players
Association football forwards
Israeli people of Moroccan-Jewish descent